The Opera House and IOOF Lodge in Colville, Washington, also known as Colville Opera House and Odd Fellows Hall, served historically as a meeting hall and as a theater.  It shows Classical Revival architecture.  It was listed on the National Register of Historic Places in 1997 as "Opera House and IOOF Lodge".

It has historic and architectural importance.

References

Buildings and structures in Stevens County, Washington
Odd Fellows buildings in Washington (state)
Theatres on the National Register of Historic Places in Washington (state)
Neoclassical architecture in Washington (state)
Clubhouses on the National Register of Historic Places in Washington (state)
National Register of Historic Places in Stevens County, Washington
Opera houses on the National Register of Historic Places
Event venues on the National Register of Historic Places in Washington (state)
Opera houses in Washington (state)